The Office of the Macau Special Administrative Region in Beijing is the representative office of Macau in the mainland area of the People's Republic of China.

Its counterpart office is the Liaison Office of the Central People's Government in the Macao Special Administrative Region, representative office of the Central Government of the People's Republic of China in Macau.

Transportation
The office is accessible within walking distance southwest from Dengshi Kou Station of the Beijing Subway.

See also
 Macau Economic and Cultural Office
 Foreign relations of Macau
 Office of the Government of the Hong Kong Special Administrative Region in Beijing
 One country, two systems

References

External links
 
 Administrative Regulation No. 15/2001 - administrative regulation establishing the office

Government buildings in China
Macau Economic and Trade Office